Fountain Lake is a lake in Wright County, in the U.S. state of Minnesota.

Fountain Lake was so named on account of there being many springs in its vicinity.

See also
List of lakes in Minnesota

References

Lakes of Minnesota
Lakes of Wright County, Minnesota